The Island Independents were a political group who stood as mutually-supporting independent candidates on the Isle of Wight in the United Kingdom for the 2013 Isle of Wight Council election.  The group won 15 of the 40 seats, emerging as the joint-largest group on the council, but without an overall majority. The group leader is Councillor Ian Stephens.

In the 2017 local elections the group had 22 candidates standing and became the largest group in opposition with 11 councillors.

In the 2021 local elections, Ian Stephens led a new Island Independent Network group.

Officers
 Vice chairman of the council, Cllr Shirley Smart
 Chairman, Phil Jordan
 Area Co-ordinator, Karen Lucioni
 Founder, Ian Stephens
 Treasurer, Peter Whiteman
 County Hall Leader, Debbie Andre

References

External links
Association of Island Independents 

Politics of the Isle of Wight
Independent politicians in England
2013 establishments in England
Political organisations based in England